Waithe is a surname. Notable people with the surname include: 

Amir Waithe (born 1989), Panamanian football player
Gladstone Waithe (1902–1979), Barbadian cricketer
Keith Waithe, British musician
Lena Waithe (born 1984), American screenwriter, producer and actress
Stann Waithe (born 1985), Trinidadian sprinter